Carlos Fortes may refer to:
Carlos Fortes (footballer, born 1974), Dutch footballer
Carlos Fortes (footballer, born 1994), Portuguese footballer